Christos Lambakis (born 19 February 1979) is a Greek former professional footballer who played as a goalkeeper.

References

1979 births
Living people
Greek footballers
Aris Thessaloniki F.C. players
PAOK FC players
Athlitiki Enosi Larissa F.C. players
A.O. Kerkyra players
APOP Kinyras FC players
AEL Limassol players
Agrotikos Asteras F.C. players
Anagennisi Giannitsa F.C. players
Pierikos F.C. players
Panachaiki F.C. players
Super League Greece players
Cypriot First Division players
Association football goalkeepers
Greek expatriate footballers
Expatriate footballers in Cyprus
Greek expatriate sportspeople in Cyprus
Footballers from Kozani